Wieda is a village and a former municipality in the district of Göttingen, in Lower Saxony, Germany. Since 1 November 2016, it is part of the  municipality Walkenried.

Wieda is on River Wieda, a tributary of Zorge in the southern part of the Harz mountains.

Sights 
There are many well-preserved half-timbered houses in the center of Wieda, for example in the High Street close to the wooden Town Hall. The Old Clock Tower is on the top of a hill offering a scenic view of the municipality and its surroundings. Lutherkirche is the protestant town church which was built in 1770.

References

Former municipalities in Lower Saxony
Villages in the Harz